Hong Yun-sang (born 19 March 2002) is a South Korean professional footballer who plays as a winger for German club 1. FC Nürnberg II, on loan from VfL Wolfsburg.

Career
Before the second half of 2020–21, Hong signed for German Bundesliga side VfL Wolfsburg from the youth academy of Pohang Steelers in South Korea. In 2021, he was sent on loan to Austrian club St. Pölten. On 30 July 2021, he debuted for St. Pölten during a 1–2 loss to Liefering.

On 24 June 2022, Hong moved to 1. FC Nürnberg II on a two-year loan.

References

External links
 

2002 births
Sportspeople from Jeju Province
South Korean footballers
Living people
Association football wingers
VfL Wolfsburg players
SKN St. Pölten players
1. FC Nürnberg II players
2. Liga (Austria) players
South Korean expatriate footballers
Expatriate footballers in Germany
Expatriate footballers in Austria
South Korean expatriate sportspeople in Germany
South Korean expatriate sportspeople in Austria